The Desha Putra Sammanaya (Sinhala: දේශ පුත්‍ර සම්මානය dēsha puthra sammānaya; Son of the Nation Award) is a military decoration awarded as a wound medal to servicepersons of the Military of Sri Lanka, equivalent to the United States Purple Heart. The Sri Lanka Police awards an equivalent, related award for its service personnel.

Award process
All servicepersons of the regular and volunteer armed forces of Sri Lanka are eligible for the award, provided they have been wounded in a manner that is classified 'moderately severe' in action against the enemy, or died as a result of such an injury. Individuals must be formally recommended by their service commander, and the decoration is awarded following a review process.

External links
Sri Lanka Army
Sri Lanka Navy
Sri Lanka Air Force
Ministry of Defence of Sri Lanka

References

Sri Lankan military awards and decorations

Military awards and decorations of Sri Lanka
Wound decorations